Thomas Lewis (1821 – 2 December 1897) was a Welsh Liberal Party politician. He was the Member of Parliament (MP) for Anglesey 12 July 1886 – 19 July 1895.

References

External links 
 

1821 births
1897 deaths
Liberal Party (UK) MPs for Welsh constituencies
UK MPs 1886–1892
UK MPs 1892–1895